Janata Samajbadi Party may refer to:
 People's Socialist Party, Nepal, political party
 Loktantrik Samajwadi Party, Nepal, political party